Nemadus colonoides is a species of beetle in the Leiodidae family that can be found in such European countries as Belarus, Belgium, Bulgaria, Croatia, Czech Republic, France, Germany, Italy, Latvia, Poland, Romania, Slovakia, Slovenia, Scandinavia, and the Netherlands.

References

External links

Nemadus colonoides on Flickr

Nemadus
Beetles described in 1851
Beetles of Europe